U set may refer to:
 New South Wales U set
 Set of uniqueness